Roland Heinrich Scholl (30 September 1865 – 22 August 1945) was a Swiss chemist who taught at various European universities. Among his most notable achievements are the synthesis of coronene, the co-development of the Bally-Scholl synthesis, and various discoveries about polycyclic aromatic hydrocarbons.

Early life and education
Roland Heinrich Scholl was born on 30 September 1865 in Zurich, Switzerland, the son of a Badensian merchant. After primary education by a private teacher and secondary education at a Gymnasium in Zurich, he studied chemistry and physics at the University of Würzburg in 1883. One of his teachers there was Johannes Wislicenus, his mother's brother. After military service in a Bavarian regiment, he continued his studies in 1885 at the Eidgenössisches Polytechnikum in Zurich. In 1890 he received a Dr. phil. degree from the University of Basel.

Life and career
In 1893, Roland Scholl became Privatdozent in chemistry at the Polytechnikum as well as at the University of Zurich. In 1897, he became the assistant director of the chemical laboratory of the Technische Hochschule Karlsruhe (today the Karlsruhe Institute of Technology). After being promoted to associate professor in 1904, he moved to the University of Graz, where he became full professor in 1907. In 1914, Scholl volunteered for service in World War I, and after the end of his service he moved to the Technische Universität Dresden, where he worked as the director of the institute for organic chemistry until his retirement in 1934.

Suffering from injuries sustained in the Allied bombing of Dresden, Roland Scholl died on 22 August 1945 in a refugee camp on the site of a former military airfield near Mörtitz, a small village in Saxony.

Research
Scholl made a name for himself in the scientific community at a young age through publications on the chemistry of fulminic acid, disproving the structures of this molecule proposed by August Kekulé and Edward Divers. He did some research for the Badische Anilin- und Sodafabrik (BASF) in the early 1900s, and began doing research on polycyclic aromatic hydrocarbons, especially vat dyes such as indanthrene and flavanthrene, in 1903. Among other things, Scholl developed a method for the synthesis of pyranthrone, the first nitrogen- and sulfur-free vat dye.

Scholl was one of the first persons to use the microbalance developed by Fritz Pregl, the father of microanalysis, who was a close collaborator of Scholl. In 1911, Roland Scholl and Oscar Bally published an article on the synthesis of benzanthrone by condensation of anthraquinone with glycerol, a process that would later be called the Bally-Scholl synthesis. In 1932, Scholl was the first person to synthesise coronene.

Over the course of his career, Scholl published about 180 scientific articles. He became a member of the Austrian Academy of Sciences in 1916, of the Saxon Academy of Sciences in 1920, and of the German Chemical Society as well as the Chemische Gesellschaft Karlsruhe in 1930. In 1944 he was awarded the Goethe-Medaille für Kunst und Wissenschaft.

Notable publications
 Scholl's first article on the vat dyes Indanthrene and Flavanthrene
 On the first synthesis of pyranthron
 Description of the Bally-Scholl synthesis
 On the first synthesis of coronene
 Scholl's final article, written from memory in the refugee camp

References

1865 births
1945 deaths
19th-century Swiss people
Academic staff of TU Dresden
ETH Zurich alumni
Academic staff of ETH Zurich
Members of the Austrian Academy of Sciences
Scientists from Zürich
Swiss chemists
Academic staff of the University of Graz
Academic staff of the Karlsruhe Institute of Technology
University of Würzburg alumni
Academic staff of the University of Zurich
Civilians killed in World War II
Deaths by airstrike during World War II
German military personnel of World War I